The 2015 Oklahoma State Cowboys football team represented Oklahoma State University in the 2015 NCAA Division I FBS football season. The Cowboys were led by 11th-year head coach Mike Gundy and played their home games at Boone Pickens Stadium in Stillwater, Oklahoma. They were members of the Big 12 Conference. They finished the season 10–3, 7–2 in Big 12 play to finish in a tie for second place. They were invited to the Sugar Bowl where they lost to Ole Miss.

Previous season
The 2014 Oklahoma State Cowboys football team finished the regular season 6–6, with a highlight win against in-state rival Oklahoma, 38–35 in overtime. Oklahoma State became bowl eligible after defeating Oklahoma on December 6, 2014. The Cowboys were invited to play in the 2015 Cactus Bowl against the Washington Huskies of the Pac-12 Conference. Oklahoma State won the game against the Huskies 30–22, in Tempe, Arizona.

Personnel

Coaching staff

Schedule
Oklahoma State announced their 2015 football schedule on November 19, 2014. The 2015 schedule consist of 7 home games and 5 away games in the regular season. The Cowboys will host Big 12 foes Baylor, Kansas, Kansas State, Oklahoma, and TCU and will travel to Iowa State, Texas, Texas Tech, and West Virginia.

The Cowboys hosted two non conference games against Central Arkansas and UTSA and traveled to its other non conference foe Central Michigan in Mount Pleasant, Michigan. Oklahoma State met for the first time against the Central Michigan Chippewas in Michigan and Central Arkansas Bears at home. The Cowboys hosted the UTSA Roadrunners for the second straight season after defeating them last season 43–13.

Schedule Source:

Games summaries

Central Michigan

Central Arkansas

UTSA

Texas

Kansas State

Oklahoma State hosted Kansas State on October 3, 2015.  Late in the second quarter, an officiating error gave Oklahoma State a first down when the offense was four yards short after the third down play.  The series ended with a touchdown for Oklahoma State.  The error brought into question Big 12 Conference officiating, especially in light that the game was on the 25th anniversary of the Fifth Down Game between the Colorado Buffaloes and Missouri Tigers.  SB Nation published "K-State lost to Oklahoma State, 36–34. Inept Big 12 officials gifted Oklahoma State a touchdown.."

West Virginia

Kansas

Prior to the game, during Oklahoma State University's annual Sea of Orange Homecoming Parade, 25 year old Adacia Chambers drove her car into a crowd of people at the parade killing 4 and injuring 47.

Texas Tech

TCU

Iowa State

Baylor

Oklahoma

vs. Ole Miss

Rankings

References

Oklahoma State
Oklahoma State Cowboys football seasons
Oklahoma State Cowboys football